Phoenix Rise is an upcoming British television series, made by BBC Studios. Perrie Balthazar and Matt Evans act as creators, lead writers and executive producers. The series will air on BBC Three and on streaming service BBC iPlayer on 21 March 2023.

Synopsis
A diverse group of teenagers who have been excluded from a West Midlands school begin their first steps back into education.

Cast
Lauren Corah as Summer
Alex Draper as Billy 
Jayden Hanley as Darcy
Krish Bassi as Khaled
Tara Webb as Rani
Imogen Baker as Leila
Tyler Fayose as Jamie Stewart
Paul Nicholls as Carl
Yasmin Steadman as Becky Phillips

Production
The series was produced by BBC Kids & Family Productions. Perrie Balthazar and Matt Evans, creators, lead writers and executive producers on the series are both from
the Midlands, where the series is set. They told the BBC they wanted to “focus on kids who had fallen through the cracks in the system, who were given one last chance to make a success of their time at school” and that they wanted a series that “champions the underdog, shining a light on kids who don’t often get a chance in the spotlight on British TV.” They met writing on Eastenders and discussed working on a new project together when both were writing on Channel 4 series Ackley Bridge.

Casting
Paul Nicholls was cast as Carl, Billy’s father, in June 2022 with Orla McDonagh playing Billy's sister Rihanna. Derby-based actress Yasmin Steadman landed the role of pupil
Federal officer Becky Phillips. Tyler Fayose appears as school headteacher Jamie Stewart. The pupils are played by up-and-coming actors from across the West Midlands with show co-creator Matt Evans saying  they wanted to find 'local talent and authentic voices' through an extensive casting process.

Filming
Filming began in June 2022 in Coventry at the former secondary school Woodlands Academy. Filming also took place in Coventry at the Steakout restaurant on Corporation Street, and Players Entertainment on Silver Street.

Music
The series featured original music from unsigned Coventry bands.

Broadcast
Phoenix Rise will be available to watch on BBC iPlayer from 21 March 2023, 2023. The series then premiers in the United Kingdom on BBC Three from 7pm on 24 March 2023.

References

External links

 
2023 British television series debuts
2020s British drama television series
2020s British television miniseries
Television shows filmed in England
Television shows set in Warwickshire
Television shows set in the West Midlands (county)
BBC television dramas
English-language television shows